Rhodococcus marinonascens is a bacterium species in the genus Rhodococcus. It is moderately halophilic and psychrotrophic, with type strain 3438W (= DSM 43752).

References

Further reading
Kuhad, Ramesh Chander, and Ajay Singh. Biotechnology for Environmental Management and Resource Recovery. Springer, 2013.
Dworkin, Martin, and Stanley Falkow, eds. The Prokaryotes: Vol. 3:  Archaea. Bacteria: Firmicutes, Actinomycetes. Vol. 3. Springer, 2006.
Sneath, Peter HA, et al. Bergey's manual of systematic bacteriology. Volume 5. Williams & Wilkins, 1986.
Alvarez, Héctor M. Biology of Rhodococcus. Vol. 16. Springer, 2010.

External links 

LPSN
Type strain of Rhodococcus marinonascens at BacDive -  the Bacterial Diversity Metadatabase

Mycobacteriales
Bacteria described in 1984